WNVI (1040 AM) is a radio station broadcasting an Adult Contemporary format. Licensed to Moca, Puerto Rico, United States, the station serves the western Puerto Rico area. The station is currently owned by Aurio A. Matos Barreto (President and General Manager of the station) and operated by Spanish Broadcasting System under a time brokerage agreement. WNVI is simulcasting on translator stations W238CR 95.5 FM in Mayagüez, Puerto Rico and W233CW 94.5 FM in Mayagüez/Yauco, Puerto Rico.

History
The station went on the air as WCXQ on 1982-06-28. On 1994-07-27, the station changed its call sign to WZNA, and to the current WNVI on 2016-02-12.

The translator W238CR operated for eight years on 104.5, moving to 95.5 on October 1, 2016.

Translator stations

References

External links

 
 

NVI
Radio stations established in 1983
1983 establishments in Puerto Rico
Spanish Broadcasting System radio stations
Moca, Puerto Rico